Our Lady Help of Christians Church is a Roman Catholic Parish church in Luton, Bedfordshire. It was founded in 1845 and the present church was built in 1910. It is situated on the corner of Castle Street and Victoria Street, next to the A505 road, in the town centre. It was designed in the Gothic Revival style and is the first Roman Catholic church built in Luton after the Reformation.

History

Foundation
In 1845, a mission was founded in the town by Fr S. Ward. In the 1880s, the mission was served from St Joseph's Church in Bedford, and served a congregation of 180 people.

On 20 January 1884, the mission was dedicated to  Mary Help of Christians and its first Mass was said by Fr Joseph A. O'Connor. Efforts were made to raise funds for a permanent church. Later, in the 1880s, a church made of iron was constructed.

Construction
In 1910, on the same site of the iron church, the present church was built. It was made to accommodate a congregation of 350 people.

Parish
The church has three Sunday Masses: 9:30am, 11:30am and 5:00pm. There is a Mass at 12:45pm every weekday.

See also
 Roman Catholic Diocese of Northampton

References

External links

 Our Lady Help of Christians Parish site

Our Lady
Roman Catholic churches in Bedfordshire
Roman Catholic churches completed in 1910
Gothic Revival architecture in Bedfordshire
Gothic Revival church buildings in England
20th-century Roman Catholic church buildings in the United Kingdom